Palmeiras is a municipality in the state of Bahia in the North-East region of Brazil.

Palmeiras is an important tourist site in the Chapada Diamantina region. It is the site of the Vale do Capão (Capao Valley) or Caete-Açu, the Cachoeira da Fumaça (Smoke Falls) and the Morro do Pai Inácio (Pai Inacio Hill), among other landscape features.

See also
List of municipalities in Bahia

References

Municipalities in Bahia